Sixer is a 2019 Indian Tamil language romantic action comedy film written and directed by Chachi, marking his directorial debut. The film stars Vaibhav and Palak Lalwani, with Sathish and Radha Ravi playing the supportive roles. M. Ghibran composed music for the film while cinematography was handled by P. G. Muthiah. The story of Sixer follows a person with night blindness, who faces difficulties in routine and love life because of his condition. The film was theatrically released on 30 August 2019. The film received positive reviews from critcs.

Plot 
Aadhi (Vaibhav) is a civil engineer who lives a happy life with his cute family, consisting of his parents (Ilavarasu and Sriranjini). His biggest worry is his nyctalopia, as he cannot see anything after 6PM, so his marriage also becomes a big question mark.

For his own safety, Aadhi makes sure to get back to home before 6PM, but that is not the case on that day as his bike causes trouble near the beach, so he asks his close friend (Sathish) for help. In the meantime, the beach gets filled with protestors who revolt against a powerful politician and ex-goon (R. N. R. Manohar).

Unfortunately, the media, especially reporter Krithika (Palak Lalwani) mistakes Aadhi as the leader of the group which earns the wrath of the politician. On the personal front, Krithika falls in love with Aadhi. The rest of the film is all about how Aadhi manages to hide his flaws and marry Krithika, while also taking care of the criminal-turned politician.

Cast 

 Vaibhav as Aadhi
 Palak Lalwani as Krithika
 Sathish as Sathish
 Radha Ravi as Krithika's father
 R. N. R. Manohar as KP
 Ilavarasu as Aadhi's father
 Sriranjini as Aadhi's mother
 KPY Kuraishi as Venki, Aadhi's friend
 KPY Ramar as Chetta
 Trichy Saravanakumar as Aadhi's friend
 Chaams 
 KPY Bala as Dokku
 Pugazh as a psychiatrist
 Geetha Narayanan as Krithika's mother
 "Angadi Theru" Sindhu as Chetta's wife
 Ashritha Sreedas

Soundtrack 

The soundtrack of the film is composed by Ghibran and lyrics are by GKB, Logan and Anu.

Production 
The film titled Sixer would not be interrelated to the sport of cricket but filmmakers revealed that the term "six" plays major part in narration of the script. The titular poster of the film was launched on 9 March 2019 by popular film director Venkat Prabhu with the film wrapped up shooting during the same month.

Release
The film was theatrically released on 30 August 2019.

References

External links
 Sixer on IMDb

Indian romantic comedy films
2010s Tamil-language films
2019 romantic comedy films
2019 films
Films about blind people in India